Valley Oaks Memorial Park is a cemetery, mortuary and crematory located at 5600 Lindero Canyon Road, in Westlake Village, California, United States.

Notable interments
Rafael Campos (1936–1985), actor
Karen Carpenter (1950–1983), singer
Billy Consolo (1934–2008), baseball player
Hoyt Curtin (1922–2000), composer
Cesare Danova (1926–1992), actor
Merton Davies (1917–2001), astronomer
Eddie Dean (1907–1999), singer
Jean De Briac (1891–1970), actor
Don Dillaway (1903–1982), actor
Josephine Dunn (1906–1983), actress
Bob Florence (1932–2008), musician
Steve Forrest (1925–2013), actor
Dianne Foster (1928–2019), actress
Ron Goldman (1968–1994), murder victim
Joel Hirschhorn (1937–2005), songwriter
Pat Hitchcock (1928–2021), actress and producer
Ruth Hussey (1911–2005), actress
Graham Jarvis (1930–2003), actor
Jack Kirby (1917–1994), comic book artist
Mort Lindsey (1923–2012), musician
Edward L. Masry (1932–2005), lawyer
Virginia Mayo (1920–2005), actress
Stu Nahan (1926–2007), sports broadcaster
Harry Nilsson (1941–1994), singer
George O'Hanlon (1912–1989), actor
Michael O'Shea (1906–1973), actor
Marty Paich (1925–1995), musician
Gene Perret (1937–2022), television writer
William Edward Phipps (1922–2018), actor
Clete Roberts (1912–1984), newscaster
Jerry Scoggins (1911–2004), singer
Ernest Severn (1933–1987), actor
William Severn (1938–1983), actor and evangelist
Artie Shaw (1910–2004), musician
Kristoff St. John (1966–2019), actor
Vic Tanny (1912–1985), fitness advocate
Viguen (1929–2003), Iranian singer and actor
Peter Whitney (1916–1972), actor
Terry Wilson (1923–1999), actor and stuntman
Shahrum Kashani (1974–2021), Iranian pop singer

References

Cemeteries in Los Angeles County, California
1967 establishments in California